Don Creech (born October 30, 1948 in New York) is an American actor who has appeared in many television shows. He is mainly known for playing Mr. Sweeney, the science teacher in Ned's Declassified School Survival Guide and the snake oil merchant Nigel West Dickens in the 2010 video game Red Dead Redemption.

He played in Barefoot in the Park by Neil Simon, starring Gail Rich.

He has served in the U.S. Marine Corps.

Filmography

Film

Léon (1994) as Stansfield man
Flirting with Disaster (1996) as a policeman
Henry Fool (1997) as Owen Feer
The Book of Life (1998) as Mormon Thug #2
Three Below Zero (1998) as Mark
Karma Local (1998) as Balthazar
8 mm (1999) as Mr. Anderson
Wirey Spindell (1999) as Mean Teacher
The Tavern (1999) as Shank
The Curse (1999) as Mr. Grant
Wirey Spindell (2000) as a professor
Ultrachrist! (2003) as God the Father
The Island (2005) as God-Like Man
Good Night, and Good Luck (2005) as Colonel Jenkins
The Curious Case of Benjamin Button (2008) as Prentiss Mayes
X-Men: First Class (2011) as CIA Agent William Stryker Sr. 
Rampart (2011) as Head Shark Lawyer
Moments of Clarity (2016) as Ralph

Television
The Adventures of Pete and Pete (1995; season 3, episode 9) as Mr. Slurm
Law & Order:
Season 7, Episode 15 (1997) as Carl Thurston
Season 9, Episode 22 (1999) as Tom Smith
Third Watch (1999; season 1, episode 2) as Reilly
Law & Order Special Victims Unit (1999; season 1, episode 8) as Atkins
Ed (2001; season 1, episode 13)
CSI: Miami (2002; season 1, episode 3) as Captain Bob Mortin
In Justice (2006; season 1, episode 8) as Fred Lisco
Ned's Declassified School Survival Guide (2004-2007) as Mr. Sweeney
How I Met Your Mother (2008; season 3, episode 13) as Old Guy
Criminal Minds (2009; season 5, episode 2) as Bill Jarvis
Brooklyn Nine-Nine (2016; season 4, episode 7) as Bill Russo

Video games
Red Dead Redemption (2010) - Nigel West Dickens
Red Dead Redemption: Undead Nightmare (2010) - Nigel West Dickens
L.A. Noire (2011) - Rufus Dixon

References

External links

American male television actors
Living people
Male actors from New York (state)
1948 births